Droolian is the sixth album by Julian Cope, released in 1990.

Background 
Droolian was recorded against the background of Cope's disagreement with Island Records, the record label to which he was contracted at the time. During this time, Cope was discovering that the recordings he made on a low-budget, one-take approach were more pleasing to him than the slicker, densely produced recordings which Island favoured. He had already recorded and released a lo-fi album - Skellington - which had led to problems with Island.

Following a similar recording ethic Droolian was recorded over a three-day period, on a 4-track portastudio set up in the Liverpool living room of Cope's old friend and former Zoo Records cohort Pam "Pammo" Young. Mastered from two used C90 cassettes, the record was cut at 45rpm. It was initially released in May 1990 in Texas only, as a fund-raising item to contribute towards the legal fees of one of Cope's heroes, the former 13th Floor Elevators frontman Roky Erikson.

The album's front cover features Cope's Miniature Schnauzer, Smelvin.

Track listing

Personnel 
Julian Cope
Donald Ross Skinner

References 

1990 albums
Julian Cope albums